Penicillium glabrum is a plant pathogen infecting strawberries.

References

External links
 USDA ARS Fungal Database

Fungal strawberry diseases
Fungi described in 1911
glabrum